Damir Kahriman (born 19 November 1984) is a Serbian professional footballer who plays as a goalkeeper.

He was a member of the Serbia national under-21 football team, especially during the 2007 UEFA European Under-21 Football Championship held in the Netherlands in which Serbia reached the final and the keeper was selected for the tournament's starting eleven.

Career statistics

International

Honours

Club
Red Star Belgrade
 Serbian SuperLiga (2): 2015–16, 2017–18

International
Serbia
 UEFA European Under-21 Championship: Runner-up 2007

Individual
 Serbian SuperLiga Team of the Season: 2015–16

External links

Guardian's Stats Centre
 - www.b1.rs

1984 births
Living people
Sportspeople from Užice
Serbian footballers
Association football goalkeepers
Serbia international footballers
Serbia under-21 international footballers
FK Javor Ivanjica players
FK Zemun players
FK Vojvodina players
FK Rad players
Serbian SuperLiga players
Konyaspor footballers
Süper Lig players
SC Tavriya Simferopol players
Ukrainian Premier League players
Serbian expatriate footballers
Red Star Belgrade footballers
Expatriate footballers in Turkey
Expatriate footballers in Ukraine
Serbian expatriate sportspeople in Ukraine
Bosniaks of Serbia